Dr Halima Begum is Chief Executive and Director of the Runnymede Trust, the United Kingdom's leading race equality think tank. Begum has held senior leadership roles with government, non-profit, philanthropy and international public sector organisations including the UK's Department for International Development, the British Council and LEGO Foundation. The Shaw Trust has repeatedly named Begum among the most influential disabled people in the UK. This follows her inclusion on similar lists of influential British-Bangladeshis.

Early life and education 
Begum was born in Sylhet, Bangladesh in the aftermath of the Liberation War. She was raised on Brick Lane in the London Borough of Tower Hamlets where she attended Thomas Buxton Primary School and Central Foundation Girls School. As a teenager, she co-founded Women Unite Against Racism to combat the rising incidence of racial discrimination and Islamophobia in East London, including Millwall and the Isle of Dogs. This period in the early 1990s saw her particularly active in the fight against the extreme rightwing National Front and Derek Beackon, the party's first elected councillor, with Begum subjected to multiple assaults in the process. She took her undergraduate degree in Government and History, and her master's degree in International Relations at the London School of Economics, before completing her PhD at Queen Mary University of London.

Disability 
As a young child Begum had a rare and debilitating medical condition that led to the surgical removal of her left eye. In an episode of the BBC World Service series Emotional Baggage, dedicated to her life and experiences of migration, Begum recounted to host Professor Henrietta Bowden-Jones how the NHS initially refused to offer her parents access to treatment for their child, despite the family's status as British citizens. At the time this was explained by a misplaced but relatively widespread hesitancy to allow immigrant British citizens from the Commonwealth access to public services like healthcare as a result of ostensibly restrictive reforms in the law, including the Immigration Act 1971. Begum described to the BBC how her desperate father, a textile factory worker, was left with no choice but to hand over custody of his two-year-old daughter to the Imam of Brick Lane Mosque. The Imam, the mosque congregation and a still-nascent London Bangladeshi community immediately organised a civil campaign to secure Begum the treatment she required. Though surgeons at St Bartholomew's hospital were unable to save her left eye, Begum retains some residual vision on her right side and to this day remains under the care of the internationally renowned Moorfields Eye Hospital.

Career 
In 1998 Begum was appointed a Policy Analyst with the Commission on the Future of Multi-Ethnic Britain. Chaired by Lord Parekh, the Commission offered the UK government 130 recommendations to challenge persistent racial inequalities in society. She went on to work for Action Aid, helping set up the Global Campaign for Education, and authored the Social Capital in Action report for the LSE Centre for Civil Society. In 2003 Begum joined the UK Department for International Development. Among a wide portfolio of responsibilities, she coordinated the Sino-British Action Plan on Food Insecurity, working with the Chinese Government under then premier Wen Jiabao, and supported the post-conflict reconstruction of Nepal as the civil war wound down from 2006. In Pakistan she led the United Kingdom's education offer, budgeted at £600 million and focused on issues including girls' education. As a senior British official, Begum represented the UK at numerous bilaterals and other high-level meetings including UNESCO EFA in Cairo, the China-ASEAN Forum on Social Development, and the ASEAN+3 poverty reduction initiative. In 2012 Begum was appointed Director for Education at the British Council, responsible for shaping education strategies across East Asia. In 2017 she was recruited to the role of Vice President of the LEGO Foundation and in 2020 was appointed Chief Executive of the Runnymede Trust. Begum's opinions on civil rights and equality are regularly sought by international media and institutions of learning including the Financial Times, New York Times and Harvard's Kennedy School of Government.

Covid Emergency Response 
Through the Covid pandemic Begum has been a noted advocate for the expansion of public health measures to support ethnic minority and working class communities. This was a result of the significant and disproportionate number of Covid deaths among those cohorts. Begum's recommendations have included increased Covid testing, vaccination priority and a targeted vaccine rollout for BAME groups. She has also offered extensive support to government messaging around the vaccination programme amid early hesitancy and a low uptake among Black and Asian communities. Her research interests during the pandemic extended to an examination of the impact of Covid on Muslim patients fasting during the month of Ramadan, and the necessity of including ethnicity as an independent Covid risk factor in the shaping of public health policies. In February 2021, Chief Medical Officer Chris Witty confirmed that ethnicity would be considered a Covid risk factor in the UK, along with social deprivation and body mass index. This step saw two million more British citizens encouraged to shield and a further 800,000 fast-tracked for vaccination. In September 2020, Begum was called to Parliament to give expert testimony about the adverse impact of Covid on ethnic minority school children, including inequalities around access to IT and remote learning. In the New York Times in March 2021 Begum questioned proposals for the adoption of digital Covid vaccine passports by the US, UK and EU. Addressing the potential for Covid passports to cause "discrimination, prejudice and stigma", she referenced the experience of young ethnic minority men in the UK who were already suffering a disproportionate incidence of stop and search by police officers as a result of strict lockdown regulations imposed early in the pandemic. As the UK government began to consider an end to the lockdown in late 2021, Begum continued to advocate for the introduction of a national door-to-door vaccination programme to ensure disadvantaged groups were protected from Covid, particularly in the inner-cities.

Board and Advisory 
Begum is an advisor to various organisations including the British Academy, the Nuffield Foundation, the Office for National Statistics, ITV and the Scottish Government. She sits on the Board of the NHS Race and Health Observatory, and Toynbee Hall. Alongside former President of the Supreme Court Baroness Hale and former Justice Secretary Robert Buckland, Begum is an expert advisor to the British Constitutional Review convened by the Institute for Government and the Bennett Institute for Public Policy at Cambridge University. Formerly, she was chair of the UK's Women's Environmental Network, a trustee of Tower Hamlets Environment Trust and governor of Tower Hamlets College.

Personal life 
Begum grew up on Brick Lane in a large Bangladeshi community, the third of six children. Her mother is a home maker. Her father, Mohammed Abdul Kadir, was an East End textile worker who fought in the Bangladeshi resistance during the Liberation War. Kadir's name is believed to be among the original signatories on the lease of the Brick Lane Mosque, a historical landmark formerly known as the Jamme Masjid Mosque and, in previous incarnations from its construction in 1743, both a church and synagogue. Begum has spoken publicly about her parents' homelessness during her early childhood and their subsequent involvement in the Bangladeshi squatter movement in 1970s London. In a BBC interview with Robert Carlyle, Begum described the considerable racial and physical abuse to which she was subjected as a child by the National Front, which maintained a bookstand outside her parents' home on Brick Lane. In various discussions on BBC Radio 4 with interviewers including Professor Henrietta Bowden-Jones and Samira Ahmed, Begum has described being taken to school with her mother and siblings, dressed in a saree and having to push through the Neo-nazi extremists outside the family home. She called this journey, "A daily act of resistance by four little British-Bangladeshi children". As well as English, Begum also speaks Bengali-Sylheti, Hindi and Urdu.

References 

Year of birth missing (living people)
Living people
People from the London Borough of Tower Hamlets
British anti-racism activists
British women activists
British Muslims
20th-century squatters